Elena Yuryevna Korikova is a Russian theater and television actress. She is known for her role of Anna Platonova in the television series Bednaya Nastya.

Biography 
Korikova was born in Tobolsk, Russian SFSR, Soviet Union. As a schoolgirl, she attended classes at the historic Epic heater-studio in Rostov-on-Don, created by director Mikhail Viktorovich Izyumsky and Elena Prozorovskaya (Izyum). Her mother sewed her own dresses.

After high school she went to Moscow to act, successfully passed the exams and was admitted to Gerasimov Institute of Cinematography (VGIK), in the workshop of Sergei Solovyov.

Korikova started acting in films. Her first role was a young Masha in the tale of Anatoly Mateshko "Kha-bee-ass-see" (1990). In Valeri Ahadov's melodrama I Promised, I Am Leaving (1992) played a young provincial Irina. In Dmitry Dolinin's drama "Golden Ring, a bouquet of red roses" (1994), based on Anton Chekhov's story "In the Ravine", she plays a quiet, frightened Lipu. She also starred in the historical and romantic melodrama, Viktor Titov's Damned Dyoran (1994), and in Sergei Solovyov's drama "Three Sisters" (1994).

For the role of Lisa in the film by Alexei Sakharov "Mistress into Maid" (1995), based on the novel by Alexander Pushkin, Korikova won the prize for Best Actress at the Kinoshock film festival, and also won the "Nika Award".

In 1995 she graduated from VGIK.

In summer 1998, she moved with her family to New York City, where she tried her hand as a model and actress.

Returning to Russia, Korikova received an offer from Mr. Volchek joined the troupe of the theater "Sovremennik" anand from 2001 to 2004 worked in the "Sovremennik". The repertoire of the actress in the role of Pat's "Three Comrades" by EM Remarque, Irene in "Three Sisters" by Anton Chekhov, Nina in "Anfisa" Leonid Andreyev, Dasha Shatov in "Possessed" Fyodor Dostoyevsky.

Universal popularity came after the release of the series "Poor Nastya", and she started being featured in numerous magazines. In 2005 Korikova ranked second in the list of the "sexiest women in the world" by FHM magazine (Russian edition).

Mass media, She has been constantly featured on the FHM list of the sexiest Russian women since 2003.

Filmography

Discography

Awards and nominations

References

External links 
 

1972 births
Living people
Russian film actresses
Russian stage actresses
Russian television actresses
20th-century Russian actresses
21st-century Russian actresses
Honored Artists of the Russian Federation
Gerasimov Institute of Cinematography alumni
21st-century Russian singers
21st-century Russian women singers